"Sensualité" is a song recorded by Belgian singer-songwriter Axelle Red. It is the third single from her debut album, Sans plus attendre, released on 10 October 1993. It is however her first single released in France. In 1994, the song was very successful in France and is generally considered to be Axelle Red's signature song. It was also the first single of the singer released under her pseudonym of Axelle Red.

Background, lyrics and performances
Lyrics were written and the music composed by Albert Hammond, Shelly Peiken and Axelle Red. This pop song deals with a love relationship in which the physical aspect is important. During an interview in the French programme La Méthode Cauet, Axelle Red explained that the song originally should have been named "Sexualité" ("Sexuality" in English), but this title was cancelled as it could have been perceived too provocative.

The song is the fourth track on the studio album Sans plus attendre. It also features on Axelle Red's albums French Soul as first track, and on Alive, as first track too. It is also available on many French and Belgian compilations, such as Bleu Blanc Tubes vol. 1, De Pré Historie 1993, Bel 90 - Het beste uit de Belpop van 1993 and 100 op 1 - De beste Belgen.

Chart performance
In France, the single failed to dislodge IAM with "Je danse le Mia" who topped the singles chart at the time, but it remained on the chart (top 50) for 38 weeks. It charted from 22 January 1994. It debuted at number 27, then entered the top ten three weeks later, peaked at number two for six consecutive weeks and spent 19 weeks in the top ten.

The song was certified gold by the SNEP, the French certifier, and ranked number four on the 1993 year-end chart.

Track listings
 CD single
 "Sensualité" — 3:48
 "Femme au volant" — 3:41

 7" single
 "Sensualité" — 3:48
 "Femme au volant" — 3:41

 Cassette
 "Sensualité" — 3:48
 "Femme au volant" — 3:41

Charts and sales

Peak positions

Year-end charts

Certifications

Covers
In 2013, Axel Tony and Sheryfa Luna released the song as a duo accompanied by an official music video.

References

External links
 "Sensualité", lyrics
 "Sensualité", music video

1993 songs
1994 singles
Axelle Red songs
Songs written by Albert Hammond
Songs written by Shelly Peiken
Tropical Family songs